Dance, Dance may refer to:

Film and television
 Dance Dance (film), a 1987 Indian film by Babbar Subhash
 Dance Dance (2017 film), a Malayalam film of 2017
 Dance Dance (TV series), a 2021 Indian Kannada-language reality show

Music
 "Dance, Dance" (Booty Luv song), 2008
 "Dance, Dance" (Fall Out Boy song), 2005
 "Dance, Dance (The Mexican)", a song by Thalia, 2003
 "Dance Dance", a song by Cage the Elephant from Social Cues, 2019
 "Dance Dance", a song by Preeya Kalidas ft. Mumzy Stranger, 2010
 Dance Dance!, an album by the Wiggles, 2016

See also
 Dance Dance Revolution, a music video game
 Dance, Dance, Dance (disambiguation)
 Dance (disambiguation)